The 1928 Milan–San Remo was the 21st edition of the Milan–San Remo cycle race and was held on 25 March 1928. The race started in Milan and finished in San Remo. The race was won by Costante Girardengo.

General classification

References

1928
1928 in road cycling
1928 in Italian sport
March 1928 sports events